David Muller, M.D., is known for co-founding in 1996 the Mount Sinai Visiting Doctors Program (VDP), that, as of 2011, is the largest academic physician home visiting program in the country. He is Dean for Medical Education and the Marietta and Charles C. Morchand Chair in Medical Education at The Icahn School of Medicine at Mount Sinai in New York City and Associate Professor of both Medicine and Medical Education.

As of 2020, Muller issenior advisor and co-founder (with Drs. Ramon Murphy and Philip J. Landrigan) of The Arnhold Global Health Institute, a division of The Mount Sinai Medical Center dedicated to finding evidence-based solutions to global health problems.

Biography
Muller was born in 1964 in Tel Aviv, Israel. He graduated Johns Hopkins University in 1986 with a BA and earned his M.D. from the New York University School of Medicine in 1991. Postdoctoral training included an internship and residency in internal medicine at The Mount Sinai Medical Center, where he was Chief Resident from 1994 to 1995.

Muller joined the faculty at the Icahn School of Medicine at Mount Sinai in 1993. In 2004, he was named associate professor of medicine; in 2005 he was named dean and associate professor of medical education. In September, 2005, he was named Chairman of the Department of Medical Education. In that role he addressed prevention of suicide, racism and curtaining debt among medical students.

The Visiting Doctors Program, co-founded by Muller is reportedly one of the first and largest in-home care program implemented. The AARP published that VDP serves approximately 1,000 homebound elderly patients annually and trains approximately 200 medical students, residents, and fellows annually in the provision of house calls and home care.

Muller holds a dual citizenship in Israel and the United States.

Honors, awards and societies
Dr. Muller is a fellow of the New York Academy of Medicine, the Association of American Medical Colleges, Physicians for Social Responsibility, Physicians for a National Health Program, and member of the American College of Physicians. He is a national board member of Compassion & Choices, and board member of the Susan and Norman Ember Family Foundation and the Atran Family Foundation.

Additional honors include:
Alpha Omega Alpha, inducted 1995
Casita Maria Community Builder Award, 2002
ACP/ASIM Richard and Hinda Rosenthal Foundation Award, 2002
Leonard Tow Humanism in Medicine Faculty Award, 2004
Gold Humanism Honor Society, 2004
Alexander Richman Commemorative Award for Humanism in Medicine, 2005
AAMC Spencer Foreman Award for Outstanding Community Service, 2009
American Medical Association’s Pride in the Profession Award, 2009

Publications
Haglund M, aan het Rot M, Cooper N, Muller D, Southwick SM, Charney DS. Trauma and Resilience in the Third Year of Medical School: A Prospective Study of the Effects of Clinical Rotations on Student Well-being. Academic Medicine, February 2009; 84(2):258-68. 
Muller D. Trial by Fire. Annals of Internal Medicine, July 2008; 149:60. 
Muller D. GOMER. Health Aff (Millwood). 2007 May-Jun;26(3):831-5. 
Smith KL, Ornstein K, Soriano T, Muller D, Boal J. A multidisciplinary program for delivering primary care to the underserved urban homebound: looking back, moving forward. J Am Geriatr Soc. 2006 Aug;54(8):1283-9. Review. 
Muller D. Do NOT Resuscitate. Health Aff (Millwood). 2005 Sep-Oct;24(5):1317-22. 
Feigelson S, Muller D. Writing About Medicine: An exercise in reflection at Mount Sinai. Mount Sinai J of Med, September 2005; 72(5): 322-332. 
Rhodes R, Cohen D, Friedman E, Muller D.  Professionalism in Medical Education. American Journal of Bioethics, Spring 2004; 4(2): 20-22.  
Smith L, Muller D, Feit E: Internal Medicine Subspecialty Training: Negative Impact of the Timing of the Application Process, Academic Medicine. 1997; 72(2):152-154.
Adler L, Sidlow R, Muller, D: Practicing Medicine Under the Influence of the Pharmaceutical Industry, Mount Sinai J of Med.
Boal J, Muller D: The Role of Housecalls in Comprehensive Ambulatory Care, Ambulatory Outreach. Summer 1998: 4-5. 
Muller D, Boal J: Serving Patients Well Means Acknowledging and Supporting Their Home Caregivers, Oncology Times. Volume 22, Number 1. January 2000.

References

External links
The Mount Sinai Hospital homepage
Icahn School of Medicine at Mount Sinai homepage
The Global Health Center at The Mount Sinai Medical Center

1964 births
Johns Hopkins University alumni
Living people
Icahn School of Medicine at Mount Sinai faculty
New York University Grossman School of Medicine alumni
People from Tel Aviv